Deerfield Township is one of the fourteen townships of Morgan County, Ohio, United States. The 2000 census found 802 people in the township.

Geography
Located in the northwestern part of the county, it borders the following townships:
York Township - north
Bloom Township - northeast
Malta Township - east
Union Township - south
Monroe Township, Perry County - southwest corner
Bearfield Township, Perry County - west

No municipalities are located in Deerfield Township.

Name and history
Statewide, other Deerfield Townships are located in Portage, Ross, and Warren counties.

Government
The township is governed by a three-member board of trustees, who are elected in November of odd-numbered years to a four-year term beginning on the following January 1. Two are elected in the year after the presidential election and one is elected in the year before it. There is also an elected township fiscal officer, who serves a four-year term beginning on April 1 of the year after the election, which is held in November of the year before the presidential election. Vacancies in the fiscal officership or on the board of trustees are filled by the remaining trustees.

As of 2007, the trustees are Casey Clemens, Paul Hinkle, and Terry Nelson, and the clerk is Phyllis Reed.

Notable people
Cyrus M. Butt, Wisconsin lawyer, soldier, and state senator, was born in the township.

References

External links
County website

Townships in Morgan County, Ohio
Townships in Ohio